Sanskrit  or Prakrit mokkha refers to the liberation or salvation of a soul from saṃsāra, the cycle of birth and death. It is a blissful state of existence of a soul, attained after the destruction of all karmic bonds. A liberated soul is said to have attained its true and pristine nature of infinite bliss, infinite knowledge and infinite perception. Such a soul is called siddha and is revered in Jainism.

In Jainism, moksha is the highest and the noblest objective that a soul should strive to achieve. In fact, it is the only objective that a person should have; other objectives are contrary to the true nature of soul. With the right view, knowledge and efforts all souls can attain this state.

According to the Sacred Jain Text, Tattvartha sutra:

Bhavyata

This potentiality or quality is called bhavyata. However, bhavyata itself does not guarantee , as the soul needs to expend necessary efforts to attain it.

The path to liberation
According to Jainism, purification of soul and liberation can be achieved through the path of three jewels: Samyak darśana (Correct View), meaning faith, acceptance of the truth of soul (jīva); Samyak jnana (Correct Knowledge), meaning undoubting knowledge of the tattvas; and Samyak charitra (Correct Conduct), meaning behavior consistent with the Five vows. Jain texts often add samyak tap (Correct Asceticism) as a fourth jewel, emphasizing belief in ascetic practices as the means to liberation (moksha). The four jewels are called moksha marg. According to Jain texts, the liberated pure soul (Siddha) goes up to the summit of universe (Siddhashila) and dwells there in eternal bliss.

According to Jainism, the Ratnatraya or "three Gems", samyagdarśana (correct perception), samyagjñāna (right knowledge) and samyakchāritra (right conduct), together constitute the mokṣamarga or the path to liberation. According to Acharya KundaKunda's Samayasara:

Samyak Darsana or rational perception is the rational faith in the true nature of every substance of the universe.

Samyak Caritra or rational conduct is the natural conduct of a (soul) living being. It consists in following austerities, engaging in right activities and observance of vows, carefulness and controls.
Once a soul secures samyaktva,  is assured within a few lifetimes.
The fourteen stages on the path to liberation are called Gunasthāna. These are:

Those who pass the last stage are called siddha and become fully established in Right Faith, Right Knowledge and Right Conduct.

means final release from the karmic bondage. When an enlightened human, such as an Arihant or a Tirthankara, extinguishes his remaining aghatiya karmas and thus ends his worldly existence, it is called . Technically, the death of an Arhat is called their nirvāṇa, as he has ended his worldly existence and attained liberation. Moksha (liberation) follows nirvāṇa. However, the terms moksa and nirvana are often used interchangeably in the Jain texts. An Arhat becomes a siddha, the liberated one, after attaining nirvana.

In that night in which the Venerable Ascetic Mahavira, died, freed from all pains, the eighteen confederate kings of Kasi and Kosala, the nine Mallakis and nine Licchavis, on the day of new moon, instituted an illuminations on the Poshadha, which was a fasting day; for they said: 'Since the light of intelligence is gone, let us make an illumination of material matter!'(128)

Liberated soul 
A liberated soul dwells in Siddhashila with infinite faith, infinite knowledge, infinite perception, and infinite perfection. According to the Jain text, Puruşārthasiddhyupāya:

See also 
Nirvana Kanda

References

Citations

Sources
 
 
 
 
 
 
 
 

 
Jain philosophical concepts
Salvation